The Church of St. George in Opatovac is Serbian Orthodox church in eastern Croatia. Church was built in 1802 with the iconostasis is from 1769. The church is located in the centre of the village next to the main D2 road between Vukovar and Bačka Palanka.

See also
Eparchy of Osječko polje and Baranja
Serbs of Croatia
List of Serbian Orthodox churches in Croatia

References

Opatovac
19th-century Eastern Orthodox church buildings